The Biel Water is a river running through the Biel Estate in Biel, East Lothian. 
It runs for 4.5 kilometres from the Luggate Burn and the Whittinghame Water, via Stenton, Biel House, West Barns, and finally to Belhaven Bay with its rather unusual bridge, whose ends are submerged at high tide.

See also
Stenton
List of places in East Lothian

References

External links
RCAHMS record of Biel Mill Bridge
An Iron Age cist at North Belton Farm

Photo gallery

Rivers of East Lothian